German submarine U-924 was a Type VIIC U-boat of Nazi Germany's Kriegsmarine during World War II.

She was ordered on 6 June 1941, and was laid down on 15 April 1942 at Neptun Werft AG, Rostock, as yard number 511. She was launched on 25 September 1943 and commissioned under the command of Oberleutnant zur See Hans-Jürg Schild on 20 November 1943.

Design
German Type VIIC submarines were preceded by the shorter Type VIIB submarines. U-924 had a displacement of  when at the surface and  while submerged. She had two shafts and two  propellers.

U-924 was fitted with five  torpedo tubes (four fitted at the bow and one at the stern), fourteen torpedoes or 26 TMA mines, one  SK C/35 naval gun, (220 rounds), one  Flak M42 and two twin  C/30 anti-aircraft guns. The boat had a complement of between 44 — 52 men.

Service history
U-924 was scuttled at Kiel on 3 May 1945, as part of Operation Regenbogen. Her wreck was raised and broken up in 1947.

References

Bibliography

External links

German Type VIIC submarines
U-boats commissioned in 1943
World War II submarines of Germany
Ships built in Rostock
1943 ships
Operation Regenbogen (U-boat)
Maritime incidents in May 1945